Felitciano Cederick Zschusschen ( born 24 January 1992) is a footballer who plays as a forward for SV Huizen and the Curaçao national team.

Club career
On 10 March 2013, Zschusschen made his professional debut in the match of FC Twente against Vitesse. On 21 January 2014, he was sent on loan at FC Dordrecht until the end of the season. The first half of the 2014–15 season he played for Jong FC Twente in the Dutch Eerste Divisie. He made a second loan spell at Eredivisie side NAC Breda in February 2015. He signed for Scottish club Inverness Caledonian Thistle in July 2017. However Felitciano left the club in the January transfer window after being a benchwarmer for a majority of the season due to multiple injuries restricting his gametime.

He returned to the Netherlands to play for IJsselmeervogels in 2018. However, only one month after arriving, he moved to Moroccan side Chabab Rif Al Hoceima in August 2018, where former AZ striker Mounir El Hamdaoui worked as director of football. He then returned to IJsselmeervogels in September after failing to obtain a playing license in Morocco. After one season, he joined Dutch fourth-tier club, VVSB.

International career
Zschusschen made his debut for the Curaçao national team in a qualification match for the 2018 World Cup against Montserrat on 28 March 2015. He also got his first goal for the national team by scoring from a penalty.

Career statistics

Club

International

Scores and results list Curaçao's goal tally first, score column indicates score after each Zschusschen goal.

Honours
1. FC Saarbrücken
Saarland Cup: 2016–17

Curaçao
 Caribbean Cup: 2017

Individual
 2017 Caribbean Cup qualification top scorer (shared with Gino van Kessel)

References

1992 births
Living people
Dutch people of Curaçao descent
Dutch sportspeople of Surinamese descent
Curaçao people of Surinamese descent
Footballers from Breda
Curaçao footballers
Dutch footballers
Association football forwards
FC Twente players
Jong FC Twente players
FC Dordrecht players
NAC Breda players
TOP Oss players
1. FC Saarbrücken players
IJsselmeervogels players
Eredivisie players
Eerste Divisie players
Tweede Divisie players
Derde Divisie players
Curaçao international footballers
Regionalliga players
2017 CONCACAF Gold Cup players
Inverness Caledonian Thistle F.C. players
Scottish Professional Football League players
VVSB players
Curaçao expatriate footballers
Dutch expatriate footballers
Curaçao expatriate sportspeople in Germany
Dutch expatriate sportspeople in Germany
Expatriate footballers in Germany
Curaçao expatriate sportspeople in Scotland
Dutch expatriate sportspeople in Scotland
Expatriate footballers in Scotland